Salam Mohammad al-Safaf (born 1979) is a Syrian politician. She has served as Administrative Development Minister since 29 March 2017. She served as Assistant Minister of Administrative Development.

Education 
She graduated from Damascus University and the University of Toulouse-Jean Jaurès.

Career
She supervised organizational structures and statutes of a number of ministries.

References 

Living people
1979 births
Damascus University alumni
University of Toulouse alumni
21st-century Syrian politicians
21st-century Syrian women politicians
Women government ministers of Syria
Syrian ministers of administrative development
People from Damascus